Dinmore Tunnel is the name given to two railway tunnels located on the former Shrewsbury and Hereford Railway (S&HR) line between Hereford station and Leominster station. The first tunnel (currently the 'up' tunnel) was built in 1853, with the second tunnel (the 'down' tunnel) being added in 1891.  Both are still in use and are jointly the 15th longest tunnels on the former Great Western Railway. To the south of the tunnel was Dinmore railway station, which closed in 1958. They are located just south to the village of Hope Under Dinmore and tunnels under Queen's Wood Country Park & Arboretum.

Construction
When the S&HR was opened in November 1863, it was a single track throughout. However, all infrastructure was made wide enough to accommodate twin tracks throughout apart from the Dinmore Tunnel which, owing to the uncertain rock strata, was left as a single bore. The engineer, Mr Pollard, recommended that if the line were to be doubled, then a second tunnel should be constructed. When the S&HR became a joint line of the London & North Western and the Great Western and West Midland Railways, they pursued the second tunnel option.

References

External links
  Photographs of the tunnels and geographical references
 Dinmore Tunnel Ranked 15th Longest Surviving GWR Tunnel

Tunnels in Herefordshire
Railway tunnels in England